Special Investigations Division or Special Investigation Division may refer to:

 Prince George's County Police Department's Special Investigation Division
 New Jersey Department of Corrections' Special Investigations Division

See also

 SID (disambiguation)
 Special Investigations Unit (disambiguation)
 Special Investigations Bureau (disambiguation)
 Office of Special Investigations (disambiguation)
 Special Investigations Section (disambiguation)
 Special Investigations (disambiguation)